Kristýna "Tynka" Pátková (born 17 June 1998) is a Czech ice hockey player and member of the Czech national ice hockey team, currently playing with the Vermont Catamounts women's ice hockey program in the Hockey East (WHEA) conference of the NCAA Division I.

Playing career 
During her early teens, Pátková played with the women's representative team of HC Litvínov in the Czech Women's Extraliga (Extraliga žen) until 2016. At that time, she secured a scholarship to and began attending The Gunnery, a private boarding school in Washington, Connecticut, United States known for its strong athletics programs. While a member of The Gunnary girls’ ice hockey team, which competes in the USA Hockey High School Girls League, she also played with the Connecticut Polar Bears U19 of the USA Hockey Girls Tier I Under-19 (19U AAA) League. Fellow Czech ex-pat and future national team teammate Noemi Neubauerová was also Pátková's teammate at The Gunnery, and with the Connecticut Polar Bears U19.

In 2018, Pátková relocated to the Hockey Training Institute (HTI) in Mulmur, Ontario, Canada, to play with the HTI Stars, an independent women's under-20 ice hockey team. She joined Natálie Mlýnková and Kateřina Zechovská as one of three Czech players on an international roster that included players from nine different countries. At the end of the season, Pátková and Mlýnková both committed to the University of Vermont as incoming freshmen for 2019–20.

International play 
Pátková made her international junior debut representing the Czech Republic at the 2014 IIHF Women's U18 World Championship, at which the Czech Republic claimed bronze. She went on to play at the IIHF Women's U18 World Championships in 2015 and 2016.

Her first tournament with the senior national team was the 2021 IIHF Women's World Championship in Calgary, and her first international goal was scored in the Czech Republic’s opening match against .

References

External links 
 

Living people
1998 births
People from Most District
Czech women's ice hockey forwards
Vermont Catamounts women's ice hockey players
The Frederick Gunn School alumni
Czech expatriate ice hockey people
Czech expatriate ice hockey players in Canada
Czech expatriate ice hockey players in the United States
Olympic ice hockey players of the Czech Republic
Ice hockey players at the 2022 Winter Olympics
Sportspeople from the Ústí nad Labem Region
Universiade medalists in ice hockey
Medalists at the 2023 Winter World University Games
Universiade bronze medalists for the Czech Republic